Jobbik Young Section (abbreviated to Jobbik IT) is the youth organisation of the Jobbik in Hungary. The organisation was founded in 2011. Motto: The future is ours!

History

Formation 
At the first convention on 2013 the members of the young section elected Gergely Farkas for president of Jobbik Young Section. He was the president between 2013 and 2019. In 2019 the members elected Gergő Keresztessy the youth wing doesnot exist anymore

References 

Youth wings of political parties in Hungary
Jobbik
2011 establishments in Hungary